KNBA (90.3 FM) is a radio station in Anchorage, Alaska. The station is currently owned by Koahnic Broadcast Corporation and primarily airs an adult album alternative music format, while incorporating programming from National Public Radio, Native Voice 1, Public Radio International and APRN.

History
The station was assigned the call letters KANH on November 10, 1993. On April 7, 1995, the station changed its call sign to the current KNBA. (Call sign KNBA was previously used by a station in Vallejo, California at 1190 kHz AM, now KDYA.)

References

External links
 

1993 establishments in Alaska
Adult album alternative radio stations in the United States
NBA
NPR member stations
Radio stations established in 1993
NBA